Ian Barford is an American stage and television actor. He has appeared on Broadway in August: Osage County and The Curious Incident of the Dog in the Night-Time. He was nominated for best actor in a play at the 74th Tony Awards for his performance in Linda Vista.

He has been a member of the Steppenwolf Theatre Company since 2007.

Personal life
The Bloomington, Indiana-born Barford is married to Chicagoan Anna D. Shapiro; they have two children and live in Evanston, Illinois.

Theatre

Steppenwolf Downstairs Theatre 
 The Minutes (2017)
 Linda Vista (2017) - Wheeler
 Mary Page Marlowe (2016) - Ray
 Endgame (2010) - Hamm
 Up (2009)
 August: Osage County (2007) - Little Charles
 Love Song by John Kolvenbach (2006)
 Lost Land 
 The Libertine
 Three Days of Rain
 The Berlin Circle by Charles Mee (1998)
 As I Lay Dying
 Time of My Life
 The Rise and Fall of Little Voice (1994) - Billy

Other theatre work
 The Minutes - Broadway, February 25, 2020 to March 12, 2020, April 2, 2022 to July 10, 2022
 Linda Vista - Broadway, September 19, 2019 to November 10, 2019 (Tony Award nomination)
 The Curious Incident of the Dog in the Night-Time - Broadway, September 10, 2014 to September 13, 2015
 August: Osage County - Broadway, October 30, 2007 to June 15, 2008
 Dead End - Ahmanson Theatre, Los Angeles, 2005
Take Me Out - Geffen Playhouse, 2004
God's Man in Texas - Los Angeles, 2002
The Weir, Geffen Playhouse, Los Angeles, 2001
All the Rage and Design for Living - Goodman Theatre, Chicago, 1998
Othello, Shakespeare Repertory, 1995
The Rise and Fall of Little Voice - Broadway, May 1994
Mad Forest, Remains Theatre, 1994

Filmography
Source: TCM
U.S. Marshals (1998)
Tick-Tock (2000)
Hellraiser: Inferno (2000)
Road to Perdition (2002)
13 Going on 30 (2004)
The Last Rites of Joe May (2011)
Catch Hell (2014)
Return to Sender (2015)

Awards 
Barford won the 1996 National Theatre Conference/Steppenwolf Theatre award.

Barford was nominated for best actor in a play at the 74th Tony Awards for his performance in Linda Vista.

References

External links
 Up play in Youtube
 Ian Barford Photos
 

American male stage actors
American male television actors
Living people
Year of birth missing (living people)
Male actors from Indiana
People from Bloomington, Indiana
Steppenwolf Theatre Company players